Álvarez del Toro's hidden salamander (Cryptotriton alvarezdeltoroi), also known as Álvarez del Toro's salamander is a species of salamander in the family Plethodontidae. It is endemic to Mexico where it is known from its type locality near Jitotol as well as a nearby site on the Mexican Plateau in the Chiapas state.

Etymology
The specific name, alvarezdeltoroi, is in honor of Mexican herpetologist Miguel Álvarez del Toro.

Description
The dorsum and tail are a reddish brown with an irregular, obscure dorsal stripe. The limbs are orange. The snout is blunt with forward-pointing nostrils.

Habitat
Its natural habitat is very moist cloud forest at elevations of  asl. It has also been found at roadsides.

Conservation status
This rare species is only known from very few specimens. It is threatened by habitat loss caused by expanding agriculture and human settlements as well as logging.

References

Cryptotriton
Endemic amphibians of Mexico
Taxonomy articles created by Polbot
Amphibians described in 1987